Steve Wharton is  Associate Professor of French and Communication at the University of Bath's Department of Politics, Language and International Studies, where he has worked since 1990. He was appointed to a consultancy rôle as Interim Head of Governance from mid-February to the end of July 2019.

He is a social and cultural historian whose research has three main strands:

 Political communication
 The German Occupation of France, and its Legacy
 LGBT activism (including perceptions and portrayals of homosexuality, and the 'gay marriage' debate)

Now Honorary Vice Secretary of the Association for the Study of Modern and Contemporary France or ASMCF, he previously served twice as both Hon Treasurer and Hon Secretary. He represents both ASMCF and The University of Bath on the University Council of Modern Languages. In January 2022 he was appointed to the QAA's Advisory Group reviewing the Subject Benchmark Statement for Languages, Cultures, and Societies

After primary school education at Wimborne St Giles followed by Cranborne Middle School and Queen Eizabeth's School, Wimborne Minster, Wharton read French and German at Aston University before remaining there for his PhD. First appointed to a lectureship in French Studies at the University of Manchester, Wharton moved in 1990 to Bath where he has remained since. Between 2000 and 2008 he served on the National Executive of both the Association of University Teachers (AUT) and the University and College Union (UCU) which was formed through the AUT's merger with Natfhe in 2006; he was the last AUT President (2005/06) and first joint President of UCU (2006/07). He led the union when it successfully took industrial action to raise salaries for the sector in March–June 2006, resulting in the highest uplift in scales for almost 20 years, in part through the application of his tenet of matching the aspirations of activists to the pragmatics of circumstances.

Between September 2016 and August 2020 he served as a Director of the Trustee Company of USS, the Universities Superannuation Scheme, appointed by UCU. He was a member of its Governance and Nominations Committee from July 2017, of Policy Committee and Remuneration Committee from May 2018, and was a member of the Rules Group, which reports to the Board through the Policy Committee, from September 2017. He also served as the UCU-nominated Director for Internal Dispute Resolution cases determined by the Scheme’s Advisory Committee following the untimely death of Dave Guppy, another UCU-nominated Director, in December 2019.

In February 2012 the French Government appointed him Chevalier dans l'Ordre des Palmes Académiques for services to French Culture.

A Fellow of the Royal Society of Arts and a Senior Fellow of the Higher Education Academy, he served as Chair of Directors of the trustee company of Bath Royal Literary and Scientific Institution (BRLSI) from February 2013 to 14 March 2019, and was Vice-Chair of its Management Committee from shortly after his election as Director in October 2011 to 31 January 2018.

In July 2018 he was appointed a Trustee of the Reform Club Conservation Charitable Trust.

He was appointed a Trustee of the Reform Club at its 18 May 2022 Annual General Meeting.

On 01 December 2022 he became a Trustee of Education Support Partnership and joined its Governance, Delivery and People Committee.

He is the author of:
Screening Reality: French Documentary Film during the German Occupation. Oxford: Lang, 2006. .

Other publications include:
 "Vichy cinema and the everyday" in Dodd, L and Lees, D (Eds), Vichy France and everyday life: confronting the challenges of wartime 1939-1945, London, Bloomsbury, 2018, 213-224.
 "Cover story: Lib Dem Manifesto tries to offer something for everyone", The Conversation online, 16 February 2015
 "Bars to understanding? The 'gay bar' in Coming Out, Les Nuits Fauves and Beautiful Thing". In: Griffiths, R., ed. Queer Cinema in Europe. Intellect, 2008, 106-116.
 "Mais la loi ne fait pas tout: l'homophobie dans la France contemporaine". Les Cahiers du MIMMOC 4, 2007, 40-42
 (With Orero, P.) "The Audio description of a Spanish phenomenon: Torrente 3". Journal of Specialised Translation, 2007 (http://www.jostrans.org/issue07/art_orero_wharton.php)
 "From margin to mainstream? Establishing a community of gay citizens". In: Cole, A., ed. Redefining the French Republic. Manchester: Manchester University Press, 2006, 82-96.
 "Pédés et polemiques: Faggots and Fireworks - Les Nuits fauves and its Moral(ity)". In: Everett, W., ed. The Seeing Century: Film, Vision, and Identity. Amsterdam: Editions Rodopi, 2000, 174-185.
 "Unwilling Filmstars: Service de travail obligatoire and its filmic representation". Proceedings of the Western Society for French History, 26, 2000, 373-382.

References

Academics of the University of Bath
Cultural historians
British historians
Living people
Year of birth missing (living people)